Roy Lambert may refer to:
 Roy Lambert (rugby league)
 Roy Lambert (footballer)